Lykshino is a rural locality (a village) in Kupriyanovskoye Rural Settlement, Gorokhovetsky District, Vladimir Oblast, Russia. The population was 12 as of 2010.

Geography 
Lykshino is located on the Suvoroshch, 15 km southeast of Gorokhovets (the district's administrative centre) by road. Gruzdevsky is the nearest rural locality.

References 

Rural localities in Gorokhovetsky District